The Rejectionists are an insurgent group operating within Iraq.  As defined by the United States Army, the group is composed of members of the former Ba'ath regime, of which Saddam Hussein was leader.  The group is predominantly Sunni Muslim.

Ba'athism
Factions in the Iraq War
Iraqi insurgency (2003–2011)
Iraq War
Organizations associated with the Ba'ath Party
Rebel groups in Iraq